Jungia is a genus of flowering plants in the family Asteraceae. It is native mostly to South America, with one widespread species extending its range into Central America and southern Mexico.

Species accepted by the Plants of the World Online as of December 2022: 

 Formerly included
Several species were at one time included in Jungia  but are now regarded as more appropriate in other genera (Acourtia and Pleocarphus).

References

External links

 
Asteraceae genera
Taxonomy articles created by Polbot